Edith Hazard (née Loudon; born 15 February 1964 in Perth, Scotland) is a Scottish curler, a .

She played for Great Britain at the 1998 Winter Olympics.

She was a member of an expert group in the World Curling Federation, who explained what kind of curling could be added as a second medal discipline to the Winter Olympics, concluding that it should be mixed doubles curling.

Teams

Women's

Mixed

Private life
Hazard is from a family of curlers: her brother Peter is a World and European champion, her sister Katie was Edith's teammate, playing together at the 1998 Winter Olympics.

References

External links

1964 births
Living people
Scottish female curlers
British female curlers
Olympic curlers of Great Britain
Curlers at the 1998 Winter Olympics
World curling champions
Scottish curling champions
Sportspeople from Perth, Scotland